

236001–236100 

|-bgcolor=#f2f2f2
| colspan=4 align=center | 
|}

236101–236200 

|-id=111
| 236111 Wolfgangbüttner ||  || Wolfgang Büttner (1905–1998), a German educator and sidewalk astronomer in Dresden. || 
|-id=129
| 236129 Oysterbay ||  || Oyster Bay is a protected harbor along Long Island Sound on the north shore of Long Island, New York, United States. The village of Oyster Bay was the hometown of Theodore Roosevelt, the 26th President of the United States and recipient of the 1906 Nobel Peace Prize. || 
|-id=170
| 236170 Cholnoky ||  || Jenő Cholnoky (1870–1950), a Hungarian geographer and professor of geography at the University of Budapest. || 
|}

236201–236300 

|-bgcolor=#f2f2f2
| colspan=4 align=center | 
|}

236301–236400 

|-id=305
| 236305 Adamriess || 2006 BU || Adam Riess (born 1969), an American physicist and Nobel laureate || 
|}

236401–236500 

|-id=463
| 236463 Bretécher ||  || Claire Bretécher (born 1940), a cartoonist who contributed to many comic-strip magazines, including Spirou, Tintin and Pilote. || 
|-id=484
| 236484 Luchijen ||  || Lu Chi-Jen, an active amateur astronomer in Taiwan. || 
|}

236501–236600 

|-bgcolor=#f2f2f2
| colspan=4 align=center | 
|}

236601–236700 

|-id=616
| 236616 Gray ||  || David Frank Gray (born 1938), a stellar spectroscopist who has published and written on stellar rotation, magnetic fields, granulation, turbulence, oscillations and spots. He was president of IAU's commission 36, Theory of Stellar Atmospheres, and director of the Elginfield Observatory in Canada (HP, Src) || 
|-id=683
| 236683 Hujingyao ||  || Hu Jing-Yao (born 1937), a leading astronomer of National Astronomical Observatories, Chinese Academy of Sciences, and a pioneer optical astronomer in China. || 
|}

236701–236800 

|-id=728
| 236728 Leandri ||  || Andree Fernandez (born 1939, née Leandri), a retired software engineer at Meudon Observatory. || 
|-id=743
| 236743 Zhejiangdaxue ||  || The Zhejiang University, one of China's oldest institutions of higher education. It was named on the occasion of its 115th anniversary. || 
|-id=746
| 236746 Chareslindos || 2007 LP || Chares of Lindos, an ancient Greek sculptor born on the island of Rhodes from the 3rd century BC. In 282 BCE he built the Colossus of Rhodes, an enormous bronze statue of the sun god Helios and one of the seven Wonders of the Ancient World. || 
|-id=784
| 236784 Livorno ||  || Livorno, a port city on the western coast of Tuscany, Italy || 
|-id=785
| 236785 Hilendarski ||  || Paisiy Hilendarski (1722–1773) was the author of Istoriya Slavyanobolgarskaya, the second modern Bulgarian history. || 
|-id=800
| 236800 Broder ||  || Henryk Broder (born 1946) of Katowice, Poland, who studied German law and political economics at Cologne, Germany || 
|}

236801–236900 

|-id=810
| 236810 Rutten ||  || Harrie G. J. Rutten (born 1950), a Dutch optician, and the author of Teleskop Optics, and numerous articles and speeches on popular astronomy that have been well received by the public. || 
|-id=811
| 236811 Natascharenate ||  || Natascha Renate Gierlinger (born 1997), daughter of German discoverer Richard Gierlinger || 
|-id=845
| 236845 Houxianglin ||  || Hou Xianglin (1912–2008), an academician of both the Chinese Academy of Sciences and the Chinese Academy of Engineering, was a pioneer of refining and petrochemical technology in China. He was also a petroleum strategist. || 
|-id=851
| 236851 Chenchikwan ||  || Chen Chi-kwan (1921–2007), a renowned Taiwanese artist and architect whose designs on the campus of National Central University are some of his masterpieces. || 
|}

236901–237000 

|-id=909
| 236909 Jakoberwin ||  || Jakob Erwin Gierlinger (born 2002) is the son of the discoverer, Richard Gierlinger. He is an IT specialist and member of the observatory Gaisberg. At the observatory, he is responsible for software development. || 
|-id=984
| 236984 Astier ||  || Alexandre Astier (born 1974), a French humorist, actor, scriptwriter and film director || 
|-id=987
| 236987 Deustua ||  || Susana E. Deustua (born 1961), an astronomer at the U.S. Space Telescope Science Institute in Baltimore, Maryland || 
|-id=988
| 236988 Robberto ||  || Massimo Robberto (born 1958), an astronomer at the U.S. Space Telescope Science Institute in Baltimore, Maryland || 
|}

References 

236001-237000